Pythagoras is a prominent impact crater located near the northwestern limb of the Moon. It lies just to the northwest of the somewhat larger Babbage. The crater has an oval appearance due to the oblique viewing angle. Only the western face of the interior can be viewed from the Earth, the other side being permanently out of sight.

The well-preserved rim of Pythagoras has a wide terrace system, and a slight rampart around the exterior. Although generally circular, the crater outline has a hexagonal form. The floor is flattened, but with an irregular, hilly surface. There is evidence of landslips around the periphery. In the center is a sharp, mountainous rise with a double peak that ascends 1.5 kilometers above the crater floor.

Satellite craters
By convention these features are identified on lunar maps by placing the letter on the side of the crater midpoint that is closest to Pythagoras.

References
 

 
 
 
 
 
 
 
 
 
 
 
 

Impact craters on the Moon